Xinshancun  is a station on Line 2 of Chongqing Rail Transit in Chongqing Municipality, China. It is located in Dadukou District. It opened in 2006.

Station structure

References

Railway stations in Chongqing
Railway stations in China opened in 2006
Chongqing Rail Transit stations